James Hong is an American character actor, producer and director who has appeared in more than 600 films, TV shows and video games. His career began in the 1950s when he redubbed soundtracks of several Asian films. Notable roles include Hannibal Chew in Blade Runner (1982), David Lo Pan in Big Trouble in Little China (1986), Jeff Wong in Wayne's World 2 (1993), and Chi-Fu in Mulan (1998). Hong is also best known for playing Daolon Wong on the television series Jackie Chan Adventures, and Mr. Ping in the Kung Fu Panda franchise.

Films

Television

Video games

References

Male actor filmographies
American filmographies